Marshall is a town in Madison County, North Carolina, United States. The population was 872 at the 2010 census. It is the county seat of Madison County.

Marshall is part of the Asheville Metropolitan Statistical Area.

History
The Bank of French Broad, Capitola Manufacturing Company Cotton Yarn Mill, Madison County Courthouse, Marshall High School, Marshall Main Street Historic District, James H. White House, and Jeff White House are listed on the National Register of Historic Places.

Geography

Marshall is located on the eastern bank of the French Broad River, one of the major river systems of western North Carolina.

Demographics

2020 census

As of the 2020 United States census, there were 777 people, 346 households, and 195 families residing in the town.

2000 census
As of the census of 2000, there were 842 people, 390 households, and 225 families residing in the town. The population density was 240.1 people per square mile (92.7/km2). There were 443 housing units at an average density of 126.6 per square mile (48.9/km2). The racial makeup of the town was 98.57% White, 0.48% African American, 0.36% Native American, 0.24% Asian, 0.12% from other races, and 0.24% from two or more races. Hispanic or Latino of any race were 0.60% of the population.

There were 390 households, out of which 23.1% had children under the age of 18 living with them, 39.2% were married couples living together, 15.4% had a female householder with no husband present, and 42.3% were non-families. 37.9% of all households were made up of individuals, and 19.5% had someone living alone who was 65 years of age or older. The average household size was 2.12 and the average family size was 2.81.

In the town, the population was spread out, with 21.7% under the age of 18, 6.8% from 18 to 24, 28.3% from 25 to 44, 22.0% from 45 to 64, and 21.2% who were 65 years of age or older. The median age was 40 years. For every 100 females, there were 85.8 males. For every 100 females age 18 and over, there were 75.5 males.

The median income for a household in the town was $24,188, and the median income for a family was $36,250. Males had a median income of $26,172 versus $22,875 for females. The per capita income for the town was $16,245. About 13.7% of families and 23.4% of the population were below the poverty line, including 29.6% of those under age 18 and 18.8% of those age 65 or over.

In the media
The Amazon Prime Video series The Peripheral shot scenes in the town on September 24, 2021.

References

External links

  NC STEP and Marshall, NC

Towns in Madison County, North Carolina
Towns in North Carolina
County seats in North Carolina
Asheville metropolitan area
North Carolina populated places on the French Broad River